Brard is a surname. Notable people with the surname include:

Florent Brard (born 1976), French road bicycle racer in the Cofidis team
Jean-Pierre Brard, (born 1948), French politician
Patty Brard (born 1955), famous Dutch-Indonesian entertainer
Stanley Brard (born 1958), retired Dutch footballer